Lindy West (born March 9, 1982) is an American writer, comedian and activist. She is the author of the essay collection Shrill: Notes from a Loud Woman and a contributing opinion writer for The New York Times. The topics she writes about include feminism, popular culture, and the fat acceptance movement.

Career

In 2009, West began working as the film editor for Seattle's alternative weekly newspaper, The Stranger. In 2011, she moved to Los Angeles, but continued to write for The Stranger until September 2012.

She was a staff writer for Jezebel where she wrote on racism, sexism, and fat shaming. West's work has been published in The Daily Telegraph, GQ, the New York Daily News, Vulture.com, Deadspin, Cracked.com, MSNBC and The Guardian. Describing West's often-comedic approach to serious issues, Dayna Tortorici wrote in The New York Times that West: has changed more minds this way than you could count. One of the most distinctive voices advancing feminist politics through humor, West is behind a handful of popular pieces — "How to Make a Rape Joke" on Jezebel, "Hello, I Am Fat" on The Stranger’s blog, "Ask Not for Whom the Bell Trolls; It Trolls for Thee" on "This American Life" — that have helped shift mainstream attitudes about body image, comedy and online harassment over the past several years. Culture molds who we are, West argues, but it’s ours to remold in turn.In 2013 West won the Women's Media Center Social Media Award, which was presented by Jane Fonda in New York City. Accepting the award, West said, "I hear a lot these days about the lazy, aimless 'millennials' – about how all we want to do is sit around twerking our iPods and Tweedling our Kardashians – and I also hear people asking, 'Where is the next generation of the social justice movement? Where are all the young feminists and womanists and activists?' Dude, they're on the internet."

On September 19, 2015, West co-founded Shout Your Abortion, a social media campaign on Twitter where people share their abortion experiences online without "sadness, shame or regret" for the purpose of "destigmatization, normalization, and putting an end to shame". The social media campaign was initiated in response to efforts by the United States House of Representatives to defund Planned Parenthood following the Planned Parenthood 2015 undercover videos controversy.

In 2016, West won The Strangers Genius Award in Literature for her book Shrill: Notes from a Loud Woman.
 
On July 1, 2017, West became a contributing opinion writer for The New York Times, after having written two op-ed columns for the Times in 2016.
 She writes a weekly column on feminism and popular culture.

On March 15, 2019, Shrill, the television series adaptation of West's memoir starring Aidy Bryant, premiered on Hulu. West was an executive producer and writer for the show, which ran for three seasons. 

West's second essay collection, The Witches Are Coming, was published on November 5, 2019, by Hachette Book Group.

In October 2020 Hachette Books released West's book Shit, Actually: The Definitive, 100% Objective Guide to Modern Cinema.

Personal life
Originally from Seattle, Washington, West is the daughter of Ingrid, who is a nurse, and Paul West, who was a musician. She attended Occidental College in Los Angeles, California.

On July 11, 2015, West married musician and writer Ahamefule J. Oluo, younger brother of Seattle writer Ijeoma Oluo.

Bibliography

References

Further reading

External links

American newspaper editors
American feminists
Fat acceptance activists
Writers from Seattle
Living people
The Stranger (newspaper) people
Occidental College alumni
Women newspaper editors
American women's rights activists
American abortion-rights activists
1982 births
American women non-fiction writers
21st-century American women writers